The  Autocephalous Orthodox Church of Albania, commonly known as the Albanian Orthodox Church or the Orthodox Church of Albania, is an autocephalous Eastern Orthodox church. It declared its autocephaly in 1922 through its Congress of 1922, and gained recognition from the Patriarch of Constantinople in 1937.

The church suffered during the Second World War, and in the communist period that followed, especially after 1967 when Albania was declared an atheist state, and no public or private expression of religion was allowed.

The church has, however, seen a revival since religious freedom was restored in 1991, with more than 250 churches rebuilt or restored, and more than 100 clergy being ordained. It has 909 parishes spread all around Albania, and around 500,000 to 550,000 faithful. The number is claimed to be as high as 700,000 by some Orthodox sources – and higher when considering the Albanian diaspora.

History

Ecclesiastically, Christians in Albania, as part of the province of Illyricum, were under the jurisdiction of the Bishop of Rome (1st-8th century). From 732 to 733 AD the ecclesiastical jurisdiction of Illyricum was transferred to the Ecumenical Patriarchate of Constantinople. The Great Schism of 1054 formalized the split of Christianity into two branches, Catholicism and Orthodoxy, which was reflected in Albania through the emergence of a Catholic north and Orthodox south. During the moment of schism, 1054, Albanians were attached to the Eastern Orthodox Church and were all Orthodox Christians.

Orthodox Church during the Ottoman Period
The official recognition of the Eastern Orthodox Church by the Porte resulted in the Orthodox population being tolerated until the late 18th century. The Orthodox population of Albania was integrated into the Patriarchate of Constantinople, with the population of central and south-eastern Albania being under the ecclesiastical jurisdiction of the Orthodox Archbishopric of Ohrid, and the population of south-western Albania being under the ecclesiastical jurisdiction of the Metropolis of Ioannina.

During the late eighteenth century, the poverty of the Orthodox Church, the illiterate clergy, a lack of clergy in some areas, liturgy in a language other than Albanian and the reliance of the bishoprics of Durrës and southern Albania upon the declining Archbishopric of Ohrid, due in part to simony, weakened the faith among the church's adherents and reduced the ability for Orthodox Albanians to resist conversion to Islam.

By the mid-19th century, due to the Tanzimat reforms which imposed mandatory military service on non-Muslims, the Orthodox Church lost adherents as the majority of Albanians became Muslim.

Movement for establishing an autocephalous Albanian Orthodox Church 
 
In the 19th century, Orthodox Albanians under the Patriarchate of Constantinople had liturgy and schooling in Greek, which was also the lingua franca in the South, and in the late Ottoman period their political thinking was divided: although most Orthodox Christians wished for the end of Ottoman rule, some of them - especially the upper class - desired to be part of a Greek state, some sought Greek-Albanian cooperation and a Greek-Albanian federation state or dual monarchy, and some who sought Albanian statehood. For Orthodox Albanians, Albanianism was closely associated with Hellenism, linked through the faith of Orthodoxy, however during the Eastern crisis this premise was rejected by some Albanian Orthodox because of the growing competition between the Albanian and Greek national movements over parts of Epirus. These issues also generated a reaction against Greek nationalists that drove the Albanian desire to stress a separate cultural identity.

The religious division among Albanians meant that Albanian nationalism could not be based on religion and instead Albanian nationalism as it developed tended to promote interreligious cooperation, from the point of its inception in the writings of Naum Veqilharxhi. Although the Orthodox were a minority among Albanians, the Albanian nationalist movement began among the Orthodox, and subsequently spread to other religious communities among Albanians. Orthodox Albanians especially in the diaspora and from Korçë and its nearby regions began to affiliate with the movement by working together with Muslim Albanians regarding shared socio-geopolitical Albanian interests and aims, causing concerns for Greece because it threatened the aspirations to incorporate Epirus into Greece, and because those Greeks who sought an Albanian-Greek confederation took a negative view of other foreign influences among Albanians. Although Greek schools were for a while the only way Orthodox children could become educated and at Greek schools children where they were exposed to Greek nationalism, Orthodox Albanians would instead come to play an active and often leading role in the Albanian national independence movement, often at great cost to themselves and their families.

At the onset of the twentieth century, the idea to create an Albanian Orthodoxy or an Albanian expression of Orthodoxy emerged in the diaspora at a time when the Orthodox were increasingly being assimilated by the Patriarchate and Greece through the sphere of politics. As Orthodoxy was associated with the Greek identity, the rise of the movement caused confusion for Orthodox Albanians as it interrupted the formation of a Greek national consciousness. The Orthodox Albanian community had individuals such as Jani Vreto, Spiro Dine and Fan Noli involved in the national movement, of which some advocated for an Albanian Orthodoxy in order to curtail the Hellenisation process occurring amongst Orthodox Albanians.  In 1905, priest Kristo Negovani introduced Albanian liturgy for Orthodox worship in his native Negovan for the first time, for which he was murdered by Greek andartes on behalf from Bishop Karavangelis of Kastoria, leading to the retaliatory murder of the Metropolitan of Korçë, Photios, who opposed the Albanian national movement. In 1907, Orthodox Albanian immigrant Kristaq Dishnica was refused funeral services in the United States by a local Orthodox Greek priest for being an Albanian involved in nationalist activities. Known as the Hudson incident, it galvanised the emigre Orthodox Albanian community to form the Albanian Orthodox Church under Fan Noli who hoped to counter Greek irredentism.

On March 18, 1908, as a result of the Hudson incident, Fan Noli was ordained as a priest by Russian bishop Platon in the United States. Noli conducted the Orthodox liturgy (March 1908) for the first time among the Albanian-American community in Albanian. Noli also devoted his efforts toward translating the liturgy into Albanian and emerging as a leader of the Orthodox Albanian community in the US. In 1911 he visited the Orthodox Albanian diasporas in Romania, Ukraine and Bulgaria.

Autocephaly and statutes 

After Albanian independence in 1912, Fan Noli, who in 1924 would become an important political figure and prime minister of the nation, traveled to Albania, where he played an important role in establishing the Orthodox Albanian Church. On September 17, 1922, the first Orthodox Congress convened at Berat formally laid the foundations of an Albanian Orthodox Church and declared its autocephaly. Fan Noli was consecrated as Bishop of Korçë and primate of Albania, while the establishment of the Church was seen as an important development for maintaining Albanian national unity. At the end of the congress the first statute of the church was approved.

The church had a second statute that amended the First Statute in a second congress gathered in Korçë on June 29, 1929. Also on September 6, 1929, the first Regulation of General Administration of the Church was approved. The Patriarchate in Constantinople recognised the independence or autocephaly of the Orthodox Albanian Church in 1937.

On November 26, 1950, the Parliament of Albania approved the Third Statute that abrogated the 1929 Statute. Such new statute required Albanian citizenship for the primate of the church in (article 4). With the exception of the amendments made in 1993, this statute is still in force for the church.

On January 22 - June 1 - July 22, 1993, the 1950 statute was amended and in 1996 was approved by the then-president, Sali Berisha. In particular, article 4 of the 1950 statute, which required Albanian citizenship for primate of the church, was no longer so.

On November 3 and 4, 2006, at the new Monastery of St. Vlash in Durrës, there was a special Clergy-Laity Assembly of the Orthodox Autocephalous Church of Albania, attended by 257 representatives (including all clergy members). At this Assembly the New Constitution (Statute) of the Church was analyzed and accept unanimously. On November 6, 2006, the Holy Synod approved this Constitution (Statute). On November 24, 2008, the Orthodox Autocephalous Church of Albania and the Council of Ministers signed an agreement according to the 1998 Albanian Constitution, for the arrangement of their reciprocal relationship. The agreement was ratified by the Albanian Parliament, and became law (nr.10057) on January 22, 2009.

Archbishops

The Primate of the Orthodox Autocephalous Church of Albania is also the Archbishop of Tirana and Durrës. The current archbishop of Tirana is Archbishop Anastasios of Albania.

Persecution
The church greatly suffered during the dictatorship of Enver Hoxha as all churches were placed under government control, and land originally held by religious institutions were taken by the state. Religion in schools was banned. Similarly, Hoxha propagated that Albania was threatened by religion in general, since it served as the supposed "Trojan Horse"  of the interests of the country's traditional enemies; in particular Orthodoxy (those of Greece and Serbia). In 1952 Archbishop Kristofor was discovered dead; most believed he had been killed.

In 1967 Hoxha closed down all religious buildings in the country, and declared Albania the world's first atheist country. All expression of religion, public or private, was outlawed. Hundreds of clergy were killed or imprisoned. As a result of this policy, a total of 600 Orthodox churches were demolished (1,600 present in 1944). Other buildings of the Orthodox community forcibly seized their religious function.

Revival of the church
At the end of the communist rule, when religious freedom was restored, only 22 Orthodox priests remained alive. To deal with this situation, the Ecumenical Patriarch appointed Anastasios to be the Patriarchal Exarch for the Albanian Church. As Bishop of Androusa, Anastasios was dividing his time between his teaching duties at the University of Athens and the Archbishopric of Irinoupolis in Kenya, which was then going through a difficult patch, before his appointment. He was elected on June 24, 1992, and enthroned on August 2, 1992. Over time Anastasios has gained respect for his charity work and is now recognized as a spiritual leader of the Orthodox Church in Albania.

Orthodox parishes with active liturgical lives have been established in a majority of cities and villages. Liturgical, preaching, and catechism ministries have been expanded, increasing the participation of both clergy and laity. Several groups have been organized to assist the church with its ministries: the Orthodox Women, and Orthodox Intellectuals. The moral and spiritual strength offered through the cultivation of a sound religious life is contributing decisively to the general progress of the Albanian society.

Most parishes use the Albanian language in liturgy, while Greek is also partly used. In Greek minority areas the liturgy is accordingly celebrated in Greek.

New clergy and ecclesiastical and theological education
The church has prepared a new generation of clergy. Anastasios started a seminary in 1992, initially in a disused hotel, which was relocated to its own buildings at Shën Vlash in 1996, 15 kilometres from the port of Durrës. As of February 2011, there were 145 clergy members, all of which were Albanian citizens who graduated from the Resurrection of Christ Theological Academy. This academy is also preparing new members (men and women) for catechism and for other services in different church activities.

Meanwhile, students are continuing their theological educations in well-known theological universities abroad.

Two ecclesiastical high schools for boys were opened – the "Holy Cross" in Gjirokastër in 1998, and the "Holy Cross" in Sukth of Durrës in 2007.

New and reconstructed churches

So far, 150 new churches have been built, 60 monasteries and more than 160 churches have been repaired.
Many buildings have been built, and others have been bought and reconstructed for various purposes (such buildings, numbering 70, include: preschools, schools, youth centers, health centers, metropolitan sees, hospitality homes, workshops, soup kitchens, etc.).
In total there have been roughly 450 building projects.
Through its construction projects and provision of jobs, the Orthodox Church is contributing to the economic development of the nation and is one of the most serious investors in the country, offering work for many local builders and dozens of workers. Since 1995, the church has put on an architecture course from time to time, each year giving more than 40 young people instruction in various aspects of ecclesiastical construction and architecture.

Media and publishing
The Orthodox Church of Albania has its own radio station, named "Ngjallja" (Resurrection) which 24 hours a day broadcasts spiritual, musical, informative and educational programmes and lectures, and has a special children's programme.

A monthly newspaper with the same name, Ngjallja, is published, as well as a children's magazine Gëzohu (“Rejoice”), the magazine of the Orthodox Youth Kambanat (“Bells”), the student bulletin Fjala (“Word”), the news bulletin News from Orthodoxy in Albania (published in English), Tempulli (“Temple”) and Kërkim (“Searching/Research”), which contain cultural, social and spiritual materials, Enoria Jonë (“Our Parish”).

As of February 2008, more than 100 books with liturgical, spiritual, intellectual and academic topics have been published.

Social activities

The Orthodox Church in Albania has taken various social initiatives. It started with health care, organising “The Annunciation” Orthodox Diagnostic Center in Tirana in 1999, with some of Albania's most renowned doctors and administers health care and most contemporary health services in 23 different specialties; four medical clinics, and one mobile dental clinic. The office “Service of Love” (Diakonia Agapes) contributes to the increasing of midwives’ and nurses’ roles, offering training projects and assistance.

The Orthodox Autocephalous Church of Albania made extensive humanitarian contributions during the political and social crises (1992, 1994, 1997), collecting and distributing thousands of tons of food, clothing and medicine. In addition, it supported a wide range of social programs including: development projects in mountainous regions, especially in the areas of agriculture and farming; road construction; amelioration of water supplies; educational programs on health for children; construction of rural health centers and contributions for schools, orphanages, hospitals, institutes for the disabled, elderly homes, prisons (i.e. financed by the church, where would prisoners work and receive income accordingly), sports grounds, soup kitchens for the poor, and many more.

During 1999, when Albania accepted waves of refugees from Kosovo, the Orthodox Autocephalous Church of Albania, in collaboration with donors and other international religious organizations (especially ACT and WCC), led an extensive humanitarian program of more than $12 million, hosting 33,000 Kosovars in its two camps, supplying them with food, clothes, medical care and other goods.

Apart from the two ecclesiastical high schools, it has established three elementary schools (1st – 9th grade), 17 day-care centers and two institutes for professional training (named "Spirit of Love", established in Tirana in 2000) which are said to be the first of their kind in Albania and provide education in the fields of Team Management, IT Accounting, Computer Science, Medical Laboratory, Restoration and Conservation of Artwork and Byzantine Iconography. In Gjirokastër, 1 professional school, the orphanage “The Orthodox Home of Hope”, a high school dormitory for girls, has also given technical and material support to many public schools.

An environmental programme was started in 2001.

An Office of Cultural Heritage was established to look after the Orthodox structures considered to be national cultural monuments. A number of choirs have been organized in the churches. A Byzantine choir has also been formed and has produced cassettes and CDs. A workshop for the restoration and painting of icons was established with the aim to train a new generation of artists, to revive the rich tradition of iconography. The Church has also sponsored important academic publications, documentary films, academic symposiums and various exhibits of iconography, codex, children's projects and other culturally related themes.

The Orthodox Autocephalous Church of Albania actively participates as equals in the events of the Orthodox Church worldwide. It is a member of the Conference of the European Churches (of which the Archbishop Anastasios has served as vice-president since December 2003), the World Council of the Churches (of which Archbishop Anastasios was chosen as one of eight presidents in 2006), and the largest inter-faith organization in the world, "Religions for Peace" (of which Anastasios was chosen as Honorary President in 2006). It is also active in various ecumenical conferences and programs. The Orthodox Autocephalous Church of Albania contributes to the efforts for peaceful collaboration and solidarity in the region and beyond.

Administration and Holy Synod

The Holy Synod of Bishops was established in 1997, and is currently composed of:

 Archbishopric of Tirana-Durrës: Archbishop Anastasios of Albania (1992-), head of the Holy Synod
 Metropolis of Berat: Ignatios of Berat (1997-)
 Metropolis of Korçë: Joan Pelushi (1999-)
 Metropolis of Gjirokastër, Sarandë and Himarë: Demetrios of Gjirokastër (2004-)
 Metropolis of Elbasan, Shpat and Librazhd: Andon (2017-)
 Metropolis of Apollonia and Fier: Nikolla of Apollonia (2014-)
 Metropolis of Amantia: Nathanail Stergiou (2017-)
 Titular Diocese of Kruja: vacant
 Titular Diocese of Byllis: Asti of Byllis (2012-)
  General Secretary Protopresbyter: Fr. Jani Trebicka

Gallery

See also
 Religion in Albania
 Albanian Byzantine Catholic Church
 Christianity in Albania

References

Citations

Sources

External links

Official website
Article on the Orthodox Church of Albania by Ronald Roberson on CNEWA website

 
Eastern Orthodoxy in Albania
Eastern Orthodoxy in Europe
Members of the World Council of Churches